Shadow Mirror or  Shadow-Mirror may refer to:

Shadow Mirror (Novel), a 2010 paperback novel by Richie Tankersley Cusick
Super Robot Wars, an element of the game series